"Treehouse of Horror V" is the sixth episode of the sixth season of the American animated television series The Simpsons, and the fifth episode in the Treehouse of Horror series. It originally aired on the Fox network in the United States on October 30, 1994, and features three short stories titled "The Shinning", "Time and Punishment", and "Nightmare Cafeteria".

The episode was written by Greg Daniels, Dan McGrath, David Cohen and Bob Kushell, and directed by Jim Reardon.
In "The Shinning", a spoof of The Shining, the Simpsons are hired as caretakers at Mr. Burns' mansion. Deprived of television and beer, Homer becomes insane and attempts to murder the family. In "Time and Punishment", a parody of Ray Bradbury's "A Sound of Thunder", Homer repeatedly travels back in time and alters the future. In "Nightmare Cafeteria", Principal Skinner begins using students in detention as cafeteria food. The episode has a running gag where Groundskeeper Willie tries to help but gets stabbed in the back with an axe, killing him. This is the first Treehouse of Horror episode not to feature a wraparound segment.

In response to longstanding complaints about excessive graphic violence in the show, showrunner David Mirkin mandated that the episode contain as many disturbing and gory elements as possible. James Earl Jones features as the voice of an alternate-timeline Maggie. The episode was critically acclaimed, with The Shinning segment receiving the most praise.

Plot

Opening
Marge warns that the episode is frightening and should not be viewed by children. During the warning, she is informed it is so scary that Congress will not allow its broadcast, and that the Western film 200 Miles to Oregon will be shown instead. Bart and Homer interrupt Marge's warning with an Outer Limits parody, and the episode begins.

The Shinning
In a parody of The Shining, the Simpsons are employed as caretakers at Mr. Burns' haunted lodge while it is closed for the winter. Burns cuts the cable television wire and confiscates the beer, thinking this will ensure the family's hard work. When Groundskeeper Willie discovers that Bart has the power to read his thoughts, he advises using it to summon him should Homer go insane.

The deprivation of his two favorite things — beer and television — causes Homer to go crazy. A phantom Moe informs Homer he must kill his family to get a beer. Marge is attacked by Homer and fends him off with a baseball bat. Homer faints in horror after seeing his reflection in a mirror, so Marge locks him in the pantry to calm him down. Eventually, Homer returns to sanity and eats happily with his favorite foods. Then, he hears Moe demanding to get out of the pantry to kill his family. When Homer refuses, Moe and a gang of ghouls drags him from the pantry.

While Marge and the children are enjoying dinner, Homer (after several false starts) begins chasing them with an axe. Bart uses his powers to summon Willie, who abandons his portable TV in the snow to come to the family's rescue. Homer kills him by burying the axe in his back and continues his pursuit of the family. As he is about to kill them, Lisa discovers Willie's abandoned television outside in the snow. Homer's insanity abates and the family is frozen stiff by ice and snow while watching TV.

Time and Punishment
Homer breaks the toaster after getting his hand stuck in it twice. While trying to fix it, he accidentally turns it into a time machine. While testing the toaster, he transports himself to prehistoric times, where he remembers Grampa Simpson's advice to be careful not to change anything should one travel back in time. Homer fails to heed this and swats a mosquito, turning the present into a dystopia where Ned Flanders rules the world.

Homer time-travels again to set things right, but he accidentally kills a walking fish. Returning to the present, he finds Bart and Lisa are giants and narrowly avoids being crushed by them. Homer sneezes during his next trip and infects a Tyrannosaurus with the
common cold, which causes the dinosaurs' extinction. At first, he is pleased when he returns to the present — the Simpsons are now extremely wealthy and about to drive their Lexus to Patty and Selma's funeral — but he is horrified to find no one knows what donuts are. He flees this reality, where donuts soon start raining from the sky.

In another realm, Groundskeeper Willie tries to help Homer but is again struck in the back with an axe by Maggie, who says, with James Earl Jones's voice, "This is indeed a disturbing universe". On his next trip back, Homer, at his wit’s end, destroys everything in sight with a baseball bat. He arrives in a present where everything appears normal. When he finds the rest of his family eating a meal with amphibian tongues, he decides this reality is "close enough".

Nightmare Cafeteria
Principal Skinner worries the detention hall is becoming overcrowded. Due to budget cuts, Lunchlady Doris is reduced to serving "Grade F" meat in the cafeteria. Skinner discovers a common solution to both problems: eating children. Jimbo Jones is the first student to be killed and served, followed by Üter. Bart and Lisa discover Skinner and Doris' scheme, as one by one their classmates are "sent to detention", where they are caged and butchered.

Eventually, Ralph Wiggum, Wendell, Bart, Lisa, and Milhouse are among the only students left. After Wendell is sent to detention, Bart, Lisa, and Milhouse try to escape, but Skinner and Doris corner them on a ledge above a giant food processor. Willie tries to help them escape, but is once again felled with an axe to the back by Skinner. Milhouse, Bart, and Lisa fall to their grisly deaths.

Bart wakes up from the nightmare to find his family near his bed. Marge assures him he has nothing to fear except the "fog that turns people inside out", which seeps in through the window and turns the Simpsons' bodies inside out. The family then perform a parody of A Chorus Line'''s "One" with Willie during the end credits, but near the end of the number, Santa's Little Helper drags Bart off-screen by his intestines and eats him alive.

Production
The showrunner David Mirkin attempted to put "as much blood and guts" into the episode as he could. This was because Mirkin was disappointed by complaints from Congress regarding the amount of violence in the show and their attempts for it to be censored. He later called it "the most [...] disturbing Halloween show ever". The opening sequence, in which Marge states the episode could not be shown and plays some live action stock footage, was also in reaction to this. Mirkin said he thinks Halloween shows can be "scary as well as fun".

This episode marked the end of the tradition of featuring humorous tombstones in the title sequence of Halloween episodes. The title sequence of this episode featured a tombstone reading "Amusing Tombstones", which was a sign that the writers could no longer devise ideas to use as humorous tombstone messages. Similar sequences were featured as introductions in all four preceding Treehouse of Horror episodes, but have not been featured since this episode.

The staff also decided against the traditional continuation of featuring wraparound segments that were featured before each story in the preceding Treehouse of Horror episodes, to allow more time for the main stories.

The first segment, "The Shinning", is a parody of the film The Shining. The film's director, Stanley Kubrick, had been a big influence on Mirkin, and was "one of the main reason[s] [he] wanted to be a director". Series creator Matt Groening admitted that he had not seen The Shining and most of the references to the film were entirely lost on him.

Groening originally pitched the idea that Homer would travel through time in "Time and Punishment". His original idea was that the time-travel would be the result of Homer simply jamming his hand in the toaster, but it was rejected by the other writers.

The first time Homer travels back in time, he was originally supposed to state "I'm the first non-fictional character to travel backwards through time". The line was later changed from "non-fictional" to "non-Brazilian". Groening was confused as to the reason for the change, since he liked the original so much. In fact, he did not even understand what the new line implied. Josh Weinstein said the line is supposed to be a non-sequitur. In Brazil, the portuguese dub changed the line to "I'm the first non-astronaut to travel backwards through time."

In the scene where the Simpsons' house transforms into numerous objects, one of the original designs included the house made entirely of squirrels. The layout artist who designed it worked on the drawings for more than two days, but ultimately it was cut. To ensure their work did not go to waste, some staff members have used the drawings on Christmas cards and other studio-related notices. 

"Nightmare Cafeteria" was the first Simpsons story to be written by David X. Cohen. He wrote the final scene where a nightmarish fog turns the family inside out. This was inspired by an episode of the radio show Lights Out called "The Dark", which frightened Cohen as a child. A dance number was added immediately afterward in order to end the show on a lighter note. The "grade F meat" joke was written by Cohen, inspired by his cousin once seeing a box of hot dogs labeled "grade C, approved for human consumption".

Cultural references
The voice-over in the pre-title sequence is a reference to the 1963 television series The Outer Limits. The first segment, "The Shinning", is a parody of the Stephen King novel The Shining and the Stanley Kubrick film of the same name. The basic plot of the segment is the same as the novel and there are also many references to specific moments from the film, such as the blood coming out of the elevator and Homer breaking through a door with an axe and yelling "Here's Johnny!". The segment also references John Denver Christmas specials.

The title of the second segment, "Time and Punishment", is a reference to the Fyodor Dostoyevsky novel Crime and Punishment and the plot, where Homer causes major changes in the future by killing animals in the past, is a parody of the Ray Bradbury short story "A Sound of Thunder". Peabody and Sherman, from the animated series The Rocky and Bullwinkle Show, make an appearance during Homer's time traveling sequence and when, as a side effect of Homer's antics in the past, Kang and Kodos' heads are unexpectedly replaced with those of Peabody and Sherman. The dinosaur scenes are reminiscent of Jurassic Park, and the floor morphing into a television screen is a reference to similar scenes in both Terminator 2: Judgment Day and Time Bandits.

The title of the third segment, "Nightmare Cafeteria", is a reference to the television series Nightmare Café, while the plot bears reference to Soylent Green. The song over the end credits is based on the song "One" from the musical A Chorus Line, while the concept of the family being turned inside out by a mysterious fog comes from an episode of the radio show Lights Out called "The Dark". "One" can briefly be heard at the end of "The Shinning", when an announcer introduces the Tony Awards on Willie's portable TV.

Reception
Critical reception 
Since airing, "Treehouse of Horror V" has received critical acclaim. Entertainment Weekly ranked this episode as the ninth best of the entire series: "The Shinning" was described as "a parody brimming with such detail [and] comic timing" that it "ranks with the greatest of pop culture spoofs" and Grandpa's wedding advice to Homer in "Time and Punishment" was praised as "one of the most beautifully random moments in Simpsons history". They concluded that "Maybe 'Nightmare Cafeteria' doesn't shine as brilliantly, but we still think it's perfectly, well, 'cromulent.'" It ranked fifth on AskMen.com's "Top 10: Simpsons Episodes" list. The list stated that the episode "offers three completely different tales, [...] boasting a potent combination of wit and humor" that, "the laughs never end", and that it "does a great job of incorporating Halloween-themed stories with the standard Simpsons charm". IGN called the episode "the funniest Treehouse of Horror to date". In 2006, they also named it the best episode of the sixth season. Adam Finley of the weblog TV Squad called it "possibly one of the best Halloween episodes ever". Michael Passman of Michigan Daily said the episode "is largely regarded as the best, but a weak final third holds it back". Entertainment.ie named it among the 10 greatest Simpsons episodes of all time. Screen Rant called it the best episode of the sixth season and the greatest Halloween episode of The Simpsons. Consequence of Sound called it "a true benchmark of the series," ranking it the second greatest Treehouse of Horror episode of all time. In 2019, Time ranked the episode third in its list of 10 best Simpsons episodes picked by Simpsons experts.

"The Shinning" is particularly highly praised. As well as Entertainment Weekly's praise, IGN voted it first on their list of the best segments in the Treehouse of Horror series, with "Time and Punishment" coming fourth. It came ninth on the blog Noise to Signal's list of "The Ten Best Treehouse of Horror Vignettes". Adam Finley of TV Squad opined that it "could [...] be the best Treehouse of Horror segment ever" and praised the opening of "Time and Punishment." When putting together the perfect Treehouse of Horror episode, Passman of Michigan Daily included The Shinning as "a shoo-in". Empire named "No TV And No Beer Make Homer Go Crazy" the sixth-best film parody in the show's history. The authors of the book I Can't Believe It's a Bigger and Better Updated Unofficial Simpsons Guide, Warren Martyn and Adrian Wood, called it "Another fine entry to the Treehouse canon". Vulture named "The Shinning" the best "Treehouse of Horror" segment ever, stating, "When you can’t think of the original without also thinking of the spoof. That’s The Shining and 'The Shinning,' easily the best Treehouse segment of all time."

James Earl Jones' guest appearance in this episode, as well as in "Treehouse of Horror" and "Das Bus", was listed seventh on IGN's "Top 25 Simpsons Guest Appearances" list. Jones ranked 25th on AOL's list of their favorite 25 The Simpsons guest stars. Matt Groening said that Maggie's line "It is indeed a disturbing universe" (voiced by James Earl Jones) is among his favorite lines in the show. David Mirkin said that Homer's line, "Oh I wish, I wish I hadn't killed that fish", is one of his favorites in the show, and that the alternate future in which the family is rich "breaks [his] heart every time". Homer's line "close enough" from Time and Punishment was later used in the Stargate SG-1 episode"Moebius".

Alf Clausen's musical score for this episode received an Emmy Award nomination for "Outstanding Dramatic Underscore— Series" in 1995.

Ratings
In its original broadcast, "Treehouse of Horror V" finished 27th in ratings for the week of October 24–30, 1994, with a Nielsen rating of 12.2, equivalent to approximately 11.6 million viewing households. It was the second highest-rated show on the Fox network that week, following Beverly Hills, 90210.

Legacy
"Time and Punishment" was later referenced in DC Comics' Booster Gold comic book series, where Booster Gold explains the butterfly effect by referencing this episode. Simpsons''-themed metal band Okilly Dokilly based their song "Reneducation" on "Time and Punishment", in which Homer visits a dystopian future where "Flanders is the unquestioned lord and master of the world."

References

External links

The Simpsons (season 6) episodes
1994 American television episodes
Dystopian television episodes
Halloween television episodes
Parodies of films
Parody television episodes
Science fiction comedy
Television episodes about cannibalism
Television episodes about education
Television episodes about ghosts
Television episodes about murder
Television episodes about nightmares
Television episodes about time travel
Television episodes written by David X. Cohen
Treehouse of Horror

it:La paura fa novanta I-X#La paura fa novanta V